Salvage 1 is an American science fiction series that was broadcast for 16 episodes (of the 20 produced) on ABC during 1979. The pilot film, Salvage, was shown on January 20, 1979, to high ratings.

Plot
The pilot centers on Harry Broderick (Andy Griffith) who owns the Jettison Scrap and Salvage Co. and is a specialist in reclaiming trash and junk to sell as scrap. His dream is to recover equipment left on the Moon during Apollo Program missions. In the show's opening title narration, Harry states:

"I wanna build a spaceship, go to the Moon, salvage all the junk that's up there, bring it back, sell it."

He invites the former astronaut Addison "Skip" Carmichael (Joel Higgins) and NASA fuel expert Melanie "Mel" Slozar (Trish Stewart) to assist him in this effort.  During Slozar's fuel experiments, the Federal Bureau of Investigation becomes concerned over the purchases of chemicals.

Broderick and his ragtag crew complete their mission and go on to further adventures in the subsequent series.  A recurring subplot drives numerous attempts to find the appropriate explosive mixture to break an iceberg from the Arctic Shelf, to be transported to the California coast as a source of fresh water.

Richard Jaeckel had a recurring role as Jack Klinger, the FBI agent tasked with keeping an eye on Broderick and his associates.  Their relationship is generally rocky, but the Salvage crew fly to his rescue when he is captured during a mission to a Latin American dictatorship.

The Vulture
Harry builds a spaceship dubbed Vulture, made completely from reclaimed salvage and powered by a chemical called monohydrazine. The main body of Vulture is composed of a Texaco gasoline semi-trailer tank truck with a cement mixer as the capsule. This is augmented with three shorter rocket boosters placed 120 degrees around the main tank.

Episodes

Season 1 (1979)

The first season ranked 48th out of 114 shows that season with an average 17.7/26 rating/share.

Season 2 (1979)

The last four episodes were shown in the early 1990s on The Nostalgia Channel, and overseas in the UK in some ITV regions in 1981.

Production
Science fiction author Isaac Asimov was the show's scientific adviser.

Merchandise
Estes Rockets made a prototype of a model rocket version of the Vulture. It was never brought to market.

Notes

References

External links
 
 
 

1979 American television series debuts
1979 American television series endings
1970s American science fiction television series
American Broadcasting Company original programming
English-language television shows
Isaac Asimov
Television series about the Moon
Television series by Sony Pictures Television
Television shows set in Los Angeles